Charles or Charlie McCarthy, MacCarthy or M'Carthy may refer to:

Charles MacCarty, Viscount Muskerry (died 1665), Irish noble and soldier in French and English service
Charles MacCarthy (politician) (died 1704), Irish Jacobite politician 
Charles MacCarthy (British Army officer) (1764–1824), Irish soldier and British colonial governor
Sir Charles Justin MacCarthy (1811–1864), Governor of British Ceylon
Charles J. McCarthy (1861–1929), fifth Territorial Governor of Hawai'i
Charles McCarthy (progressive) (1873–1921), Wisconsin progressive reformer and political scientist, Georgia football coach
Charles F. McCarthy (fl. 1876–1917), mayor of Marlborough, Massachusetts
Charlie McCarthy (ice hockey) (1889–1969), Canadian ice hockey player and boxer
Charles McCarthy (cricketer) (1899–1977), English cricketer
Charlie McCarthy (hurler) (born 1946), Irish hurler
Charlie McCarthy (Gaelic footballer) (born c. 1977), Irish Gaelic footballer for Gneeveguilla
Charles McCarthy (fighter) (born 1980), American mixed martial arts fighter
Charlie McCarthy, best known of the puppets used by ventriloquist Edgar Bergen